Logan Heights may refer to:
Logan Heights, San Diego
Logan Heights Gang, a street gang in San Diego
Logan Heights, West Virginia